Yashar Mammadzade Stadium is a multi-purpose stadium in Mingachevir, Azerbaijan.  It is currently used mostly for football matches and is the home stadium of Energetik FC. The stadium holds 5,000 people.

References

See also
List of football stadiums in Azerbaijan

Sport in Azerbaijan
Football venues in Azerbaijan
Multi-purpose stadiums in Azerbaijan